, more commonly known as E. Honda, is a fictional character created by Capcom for the Street Fighter series of fighting games. Introduced in Street Fighter II as part of the starting lineup, he has appeared in Street Fighter Alpha 3, Street Fighter IV and the Capcom vs. SNK series, as well as several cameos. Honda is a professional sumo wrestler and sentō proprietor. He is one of the original eight playable characters in Street Fighter II, representing Japan alongside Ryu.

Conception and design
Designed by Akira Yasuda, the character was initially named "Sumo". As his initial name implies, Honda is meant to have above average strength, but below average speed. The developers intended for the character to be popular in Japan, but to also make Japanese fighting styles appeal to foreigners. Honda's shikona for sumo is mentioned as "Fujinoyama." He wears his black hair in an ōichō mage and dresses in a blue and white striped yukata over a red mawashi, with the upper half of the yukata folded down over the belt to leave his upper body exposed. His face is painted in the kumadori style of makeup used in kabuki. Honda's signature move is the Hyaku Retsu Harite (lit., "Hundred Violent Sumo Hands"; commonly referred to as the Hundred Hand Slap).

Stage

E. Honda's stage is called  in Street Fighter II. It is inside of a fictional  (public bath) in Kapukon Yu (加富根湯), Higashi Komagata, Tokyo. Kapukon Yu is located in the western part of Tokyo called Yamanote. This is historically an upper-class residential area of the city. Shitamachi is historically Tokyo's working-class area. Yamanote and Shitamachi have symbolic meanings. For Honda's personality, it means that he's honest, sincere, forthright, and a bit conservative. The sumo ring in the bathhouse is made of vinyl so that it's sanitized when it gets wet. A regular sumo ring circle is made of rice-straw bales which deform with water. The illuminating decoration is managed by Honda’s disciples from a backroom. According to the backstory Honda was raised in a large bathhouse since a young age. Since Honda loves both sumo and hot baths he decided to combine both and made a sumo ring in the public bath.

As of 2017 Ultra Street Fighter II: The Final Challengers, rising sun imagery from the background of the stage has been removed, which then applies to the stage's later Street Fighter-related appearances, including classic game compilations involving classic 2D Street Fighter games. The rising sun image is considered controversial in some Asian countries.

Appearances
In his backstory in Street Fighter II, E. Honda is mentioned to have begun his training as a child, singularly focused on becoming the greatest sumo wrestler of all time. He would eventually achieve the highly revered title of "Ōzeki" (in the English localization of the early Street Fighter II ports, he is stated as having achieved the title, Yokozuna). Honda became upset that the rest of the world did not view sumo wrestling with the reverence of the Japanese. He entered into the second World Warrior tournament intent on showing everyone that sumo wrestlers rank among the greatest fighters in the world. Beyond this, he yearns also to improve and prove his own strength, as well as earn the title of Yokuzuna. While involved in the tournament, he takes the opportunity to investigate Shadaloo, in response to sumo wrestlers having taken drugs he traced back to the organization. His face painting and culturally-ambiguous name assisted him in his covert operations. Following the tournament and the fall of Shadaloo, Honda returned to Japan where he continued wrestling professionally and continuing to run his bath house and training his disciples.

Honda makes a cameo appearance in Street Fighter Alpha 2, during Sodom's storyline. Sodom, obsessed with both Japanese culture and trying to revive Mad Gear, attempts to recruit sumo wrestlers, citing them as strong warriors. To achieve this he enters a sumo wrestling competition and faces "Fujinoyama", who is revealed to be Honda. Agreeing to the match, Honda defeats Sodom but is impressed by his effort nevertheless according to their dialogue in Alpha 3. In Street Fighter Alpha 3, his storyline in this game serves more of a prologue to his appearance in Street Fighter II, with him traveling the world looking for strong opponents and to show the strength of sumo wrestling. Here he meets Ryu and has a sparring match with him and tells Sakura later on where she can find him. About this time he fights Sodom again in a friendly match as well. His wanderings lead him to Shadaloo's base where he meets Zangief and while the actual extent of which is unknown the two are confirmed to have worked together to help destroy the base. In the aftermath he took in a few of Bison's Dolls to give them somewhere to stay until they could regain their memories (which ones in particular is never exactly certain due to Capcom reusing sprites in his ending for the Dolls). According to this game's ending and supported by his card profile in SNK vs. Capcom: Card Fighters DS he may additionally have given them training in sumo during their stay, though none of his pupils in other games are female leaving this definitely up to question.

Honda returns for Street Fighter IV, which is set shortly after the events of the second World Warrior Tournament. His goals have not changed, as his bio states that he is fighting to promote the technique of sumo. To this end, he goes on a world tour. It is revealed that he is a haridashi-yokozuna (effectively meaning that he is of yokozuna level skill and achievement, but has yet to be officially promoted). His rival fight is against El Fuerte, after which the two share a meal. Honda returns in the fourth season of Street Fighter V, having reopened the Honda Sento bathhouse and working to keep its guests happy.

Honda has made several appearances outside of the main Street Fighter franchise. SNK vs. Capcom continues his Street Fighter II storyline, as he strives to prove the strength of sumo to the world. He mentions his disciples in his ending, placing this version of him closer to his SFII counterpart in terms of continuity. Marvel vs. Capcom features a stage titled "Honda's Bath House", however, this version appears drastically different from its Street Fighter II counterpart. Honda makes a cameo appearance in Super Gem Fighter Mini Mix, in the bar stage, sitting next to Cammy and being served by Dee Jay.

In other media

In the 1994 motion picture based on the Street Fighter franchise, the role of Honda is played by Peter "Navy" Tuiasosopo. In the movie, Honda is portrayed as a close associate of Chun Li, serving as her news crew technician and programmer, while aiding her on her quest to avenge her father's death alongside Balrog. Like Balrog, he has a personal grudge against Shadaloo, who ruined his reputation as a sumo (though no details on how are given). In the film's climax he battles Zangief, smashing through Bison's base. While he remains Japanese ethnically just like in the games, the film version is of mixed race, having Japanese and Polynesian heritage, and is native to Hawaii, just as many Japanese Americans are. His personality is rather laid back compared to his video game counterpart and is shown to have a near immunity to pain when one of Bison's goons attempts to torture him, something he attributes to his discipline in sumo when Balrog asks about it. He does seem to enjoy fighting when he gets a chance to with Zangief, despite the degree of damage that it causes. This version of Honda appeared in both the arcade and console games based on the film. In his arcade ending it states that he returned to the world of professional sumo and regained the title of yokuzuna. The console game took this and expanded upon it, stating that he and Zangief had formed a friendship and had practice matches with Honda only having one win over Zangief. The outcomes of said matches however seem to be just as calamitous as their original bout, resulting in the destruction of five sumo dojos.

Honda appears as one of the more prominent characters to appear in the second half of Street Fighter II: The Animated Movie, unlike a majority of the characters that were not heavily involved in the backstory of the game. He is voiced by Daisuke Gori in the original Japanese version and by Richard Epcar in the English dub. His personality is relatively unchanged from that in the games, however his goal is shown to be to fight for cash compared to his in-game goal of proving the strength of sumo to the world. Several aspects of his character appearance here saw usage in the Street Fighter Alpha series much like many other characters, but more so in the Capcom vs. SNK games, where outright nods (such as his run animation being a direct copy of his attempt to charge into Bison) were included in the game. He is first seen wrestling with Dhalsim in Calcutta to win prize money. Dhalsim manages to slip away from his grip however, and attempts to mentally subdue Honda. Ryu's presence however distracts Dhalsim enough for Honda to regain control of the match and win due to forfeit. Honda catches up with Ryu, recognizing he helped him win and the fact Ryu is a fellow Japanese fighter, giving him half the prize money as well as a place to stay for a while. Near the movie's climax, Guile and Bison find Ryu while he is with Honda in the mountains. While Ryu tries to deal with a brainwashed Ken, Honda charges forward to take on Bison, only for Bison to teleport out of his path and Ken strikes him which sends him stumbling forward, straight into Balrog. He and Balrog end up fighting, eventually with both of them falling off a nearby cliff. However Honda seems to recover quickly enough, seen lugging both the unconscious Balrog and Guile (who was knocked out by Bison) back just as Ryu and Ken apparently defeat Bison.

Paul Dobson voices Honda in the animated series, where he works for the team as a computer whiz.

Merchandising
Honda was the seventh action figure made in a series for the 1993 G.I. Joe Street Fighter line. The figure is actually unique compared to the others: no parts were reused to make it, requiring a unique mold needing to be made due to his size. The character's legs could be squeezed together to have the upper body bend down in a headbutt motion and was jointed to allow for the Hundred Hand Slap move. The toy was discontinued in 1994. A variant of it was later released in 1994 for the Street Fighter live action movie line of toys by Hasbro, a tweaked version of the previous action figure (complicating a bit, as the toy resembled the actor in the film very little and more the video game counterpart). Like all toys in the line, both came with attachable weapon pieces despite the fact the character did not use any in the game or film. Another action figure was released much later on as part of SOTA's Revolutions Series 1. The figure featured a positionable waist, arms, and legs, and an alternate head for different facial expression. A limited edition version of the figure using Honda's default Street Fighter II Turbo colors was released in the second quarter of 2008, with only 504 units produced.

Reception
In 1992, E. Honda ranked at number eight on the list of Best Characters of 1991 by the Gamest magazine in Japan. IGN ranked Honda at number 14 in their list of top Street Fighter characters, citing his role as one of sumo's few representatives in fighting games, though complained about his gameplay similarities to Blanka. GameDaily listed him at number 11 on their list of top Street Fighter characters of all time, stating "We have a fondness for sumo wrestlers, and E. Honda is one of the best." In a comparison piece between the characters of Street Fighter II and their appearance in Street Fighter IV, they noted he had changed little, though added "he didn't need to". GameSpy named him one of the 25 "extremely rough brawlers" in video gaming, citing the use of his weight in his fighting style. GamesRadar editor Chris Antista listed him as one of "gaming's greatest fatties". GamesRadar said "E. Honda's signature Hundred Hand Slap has become one of the most feared and iconic moves in beat-'em-ups", however included him in a list of "Gaming's fittest fatties", saying he could not be so fast with his size and he "would have a heart attack half way through the first round" against the game's "fitness freaks". They listed a matchup between him and Ganryu as one of the ones they wanted to see in Street Fighter X Tekken. 1UP.com included E. Honda as one of the characters they wanted to see in Street Fighter X Tekken, commenting "If a sumo wrestler is going to be in the game, I would like to see E. Honda over Ganryu make the cut".

Images of E. Honda were barred from display at a Street Fighter II Turbo tournament held at the Ryōgoku Kokugikan because, according to a report in Electronic Gaming Monthly, "his painted face was considered a sacrilege to the Japanese national sport."

References

Action film characters
Capcom protagonists
Fictional Japanese people in video games
Fictional sumo wrestlers
Male characters in video games
Street Fighter characters
Video game characters introduced in 1991